Markéta Krausová (April 20, 1895 — July 7, 1942) was a Czech Jewish film and stage actress and opera singer.

She was born in Prague, Czech lands, then Austria-Hungary, now Czech Republic as Margarete Brennerová to the Jewish family of the owner and director of a small company Robert Brenner and Matilda née Oppenheimerová. She had two older brothers and a younger sister. In 1919 she married Oskar Kraus and in 1922 they had a daughter, Felcitas. They divorced in 1926. 

Markéta Krausová worked as opera soloist in Munich and Vienna. In 1934-1936 she starred in six films. Soon after that she could no longer perform due to her Jewish origin.

Because of a long life abroad she became a citizen of Czechoslovakia only in 1938.

The Czechoslovak Film Database writes that she probably managed to emigrate and her life during this period is unknown. She was transported to the Majdanek concentration camp and was murdered there on July 2, 1942.

Filmography
1934: The Poacher from Egerland 
1934: A Woman Who Knows What She Wants
1934: Romance from the Tatra Mountains
1935: Král ulice
1935: První políbení
1936: Lojzička

References

External links

1895 births
1942 deaths
Czechoslovak film actresses
Czechoslovak stage actresses
Czechoslovak Jews who died in the Holocaust
People who died in Majdanek concentration camp